Garron Plateau ASSI  is  a 4652.18-hectare area of special scientific interest in County Antrim, Northern Ireland. Upland blanket bogs cover basalt rocks, and flushing by mineral-enriched water has resulted in the formation of alkaline fen vegetation. There are  small areas of standing and  running water but  bogs, marshes, water fringed vegetation and fens cover 70% of the area. The remainder is heath and scrubland, humid grassland and mesophile grassland.

The peatland complex is composed of a series of raised and flushed peat bog and oligotrophic lakes. Plants include Erica tetralix, Trichophorum cespitosum, Eriophorum vaginatum, dwarf-shrubs and Sphagnum papillosum, Sphagnum fuscum and Sphagnum imbricatum. Garron Plateau  is the main Irish location for Carex pauciflora and Carex magellanica. The areas of flushed peat are floristically rich, with black bog-rush Schoenus nigricans and brown mosses. The site contains  populations of Saxifraga hirculus and the  bog orchid Hammarbya paludosa.

References

Nature reserves in Northern Ireland
Ramsar sites in Northern Ireland